Vangelis Syrigos (born March 2, 1949) is a Greek former footballer who played as a goalkeeper.

Career
Syrigos began playing at the youth level with Olympiacos around 1969. In 1969, he was loaned to play in the Beta Ethniki with DAO Argonautis Piraeus. In 1973, he played in the Alpha Ethniki with Egaleo When Egaleo were relegated in 1975 he assisted in securing promotion back to the top flight by winning the league title in 1976. In the summer of 1975 he played abroad in the National Soccer League with Windsor Stars. In his debut season with Windsor he was named the league's top goalkeeper. He returned to play with Windsor for the 1977 summer season.

In 1979, he signed with league rivals Panionios, and later signed with Rodos in 1982. In 1983, he played in the Gamma Ethniki with PAO Thriamvos Athens. He returned to the Alpha Ethniki in 1985 with Apollon Athens for two seasons. He had another stint in the Beta Ethniki in 1987 with Kallithea He would later conclude his career at the amateur levels with Profitis Elias, Pomegranate, and Rodopolis.

References

Living people
1949 births
Association football goalkeepers
Greek footballers
Egaleo F.C. players
Panionios F.C. players
Rodos F.C. players
Apollon Smyrnis F.C. players
Kallithea F.C. players
Super League Greece players
Gamma Ethniki players
Canadian National Soccer League players
Greek expatriate footballers
Expatriate soccer players in Canada
Greek expatriate sportspeople in Canada